Muhammad Nasiruddin Khan Khakwani (مولانا حافظ ناصرالدین خان خاکوانی) (born; 1942) is a Pakistani Islamic scholar and current Emir of the Aalmi Majlis Tahaffuz Khatm-e-Nubuwwat since August 2021.

Khakwani has also served as Deputy Emir. After the death of Abdur Razzaq Iskander he was appointed as Emir of the Aalmi Majlis Tahaffuz Khatm-e-Nubuwwat.

References

Living people
1942 births
People from Multan
Aitchison College alumni
Emirs of Aalmi Majlis Tahaffuz Khatm-e-Nubuwwat
Aalmi Majlis Tahaffuz Khatm-e-Nubuwwat people
Pakistani Islamic religious leaders
Pakistani Sunni Muslim scholars of Islam
Muslim missionaries
Deobandis
Deputy Emirs of Aalmi Majlis Tahaffuz Khatm-e-Nubuwwat